Stare Selo (Ukrainian: Старе Село; Polish: Stare Sioło; literally, "old village") is a village in Lviv Raion, Lviv Oblast, Ukraine known as the site of a large castle, or rather fortress, of Princes Ostrogski. It belongs to Davydiv rural hromada, one of the hromadas of Ukraine.

On August 29, 2016, a Mercedes SUV belonging to the Lviv Kholodokombinat OJSC was first blown up in the village with a charge (or mine) planted in the roadway, then shot with automatic weapons. The driver and two security guards were killed. The incident was linked to an attempted assassination of the owner of the company, Bohdan Kopytko. 

Until 18 July 2020, Stare Selo belonged to Pustomyty Raion. The raion was abolished in July 2020, as part of the administrative reform of Ukraine, which reduced the number of raions of Lviv Oblast to seven. The area of Pustomyty Raion was merged into Lviv Raion.

References

Notes

Sources
 Памятники градостроительства и архитектуры Украинской ССР. В 4-х томах. К.: Будівельник, 1983–1986. Том 3, с. 186–187.

Villages in Lviv Raion